Seremban 2 is a planned satellite town located about four kilometers southeast of downtown Seremban in Seremban District, Negeri Sembilan, Malaysia. Located west of the North-South Expressway's EXIT 218 Seremban, Seremban 2 is built on a former oil palm plantation site. It was established to relocate the administrative, business and education services in Negeri Sembilan away from the capital. Several shopping malls have been opened in Seremban 2, such as ÆON, Tesco, Mydin, S2 Mall & NSK Trade City.

Neighbourhoods

 Green Street Homes
 Sri Carcosa
 Central Park
 Emerald Park
 Garden Homes
 Garden Avenue
 Garden City Homes
 Vision Homes
 S2 Heights
 Park Avenue
 Pearl 132
 City Park
 Acacia 
 Seremban 2 City Center
 Aviva Green
 Saujana Duta
 Aeon (Or known as JUSCO)
 Saujana Prima
 Saujana Tropika
 Symphony
 Melody

Education
SJK(C) Tung Hua
SK Seremban 2A
SK Seremban 2B
SK Wawasan
SMK Seremban 2
SMK Bukit Kepayang
Zenith International School

Development 
Seremban 2, IJM LAND's flagship development in Negeri Sembilan is a 2,300 acres self-contained township offering modern amenities and convenience of a city while maintaining the grace and serenity of a country atmosphere. To date, Seremban 2 has emerged as one of the most progressive and successful developments in Negeri Sembilan, and the development is currently at 90% completion with a population of 62,000

Seremban 2 is strategically located 4 km from the Seremban toll plaza and 9 km from Seremban town. Accessibility to the township via the North-South Highway, ELITE and LEKAS highways have brought Seremban 2 closer to crucial locations such as Kuala Lumpur City Centre (45 minutes), Kuala Lumpur International Airport (30 minutes), Putrajaya and Cyberjaya (30 minutes).

Seremban 2 will serve as the gateway to the Greater Klang Valley under the recent National Structure Plan, which gazetted 30% of Negeri Sembilan, including Port Dickson, Nilai and Labu. This is part of the Federal Government efforts to bring development to the region.

Seremban 2 offers a wide selection of beautifully designed homes ranging from affordable apartments to well-planned terrace houses and from super linked and semi-detached houses to exclusive gated bungalows. Seremban 2 comprises 9 residential communities, 5 schools, a 15-acre City Lake Park, a Sports Complex, a modern Shopping Centre, and Commercial Business Parks. Seremban 2 is also home to the state government and local authorities.

On-Going Project 
Under IJM Land

References

Towns in Negeri Sembilan